PULSE is a P2PTV application developed by the European FP7 NAPA-WINE (Network-Aware P2P-TV Application over Wise Networks) research consortium.

PULSE stands for Peer-to-Peer Unstructured Live Streaming Experiment and is a peer-to-peer live streaming system designed to operate in scenarios where the bandwidth resources of nodes can be highly heterogeneous and variable over time, as is the case for the Internet.

History
The principles and basic algorithms of PULSE were proposed by Fabio Pianese.

The prototype was developed by Diego Perino

and released with a LGPL Software License.
The development has been taken over by the NAPA-WINE consortium in 2008, and version 0.2.2 can be downloaded via anonymous svn from the NAPA-WINE website.

P2PMyLive
In 2009, PULSE introduced P2PMyLive, where content providers can announce their streaming. Either the source or the participant can use the same graphical front-end to the pulse engine, which is available for Windows and Linux Ubuntu. Live streaming can be performed without any restriction.

See also
 P2PTV
 PeerStreamer (from NAPA-WINE too, first released in 2011).

References

Streaming television
Distributed algorithms
Peercasting
Peer-to-peer software